Subnational or sub-national may refer to:

 Administrative division, all administrative divisions are under the national level
 Subnational legislature, a type of regional legislature, under the national level
 Subnational state, a type of state, under the national level
 Subnational diplomacy, a form of diplomacy, under the national level
 Subnational flag, a flag of an entity under the national level

See also
 Supranational (disambiguation)
 International (disambiguation)
 Multinational (disambiguation)
 Transnational (disambiguation)
 National (disambiguation)